Hansteen may refer to:

 Christopher Hansteen (1784–1873), Norwegian astronomer and physicist
 Wilhelm von Tangen Hansteen (1896–1980), Norwegian military officer
 Hansteen (crater), a lunar crater named after Christopher Hansteen
 Geir Hansteen Jörgensen, Swedish Film-director
 Hansteen Holdings, UK listed company